The M121/A1 155mm Projectile was a chemical artillery shell designed for use by the U.S. Army.

History
The U.S. Army standardized the M121 shell in 1954 as an artillery shell capable of delivering sarin via a 155mm howitzer.  Shortly after the discovery of VX in 1952, the U.S. Army Chemical Corps began experimenting with employment systems for the newly discovered nerve agent.  The M121A1 was standardized in 1961 as a modified version of the original projectile with the additional capability of transporting VX as well as sarin.  The M121 and M121A1 have never been used in combat and remaining stockpiles are currently being disposed of in accordance with the 1997 Chemical Weapons Convention.

Design

The M121A1 is identical to the M121 with the exception of it using a larger fuze assembly, which makes the entire projectile .

See also
M104 155mm Projectile
M110 155mm Projectile
M687 155 mm Projectile

References

Chemical weapon delivery systems
155mm artillery shells
Chemical weapons of the United States